Slashten is a village in Southwestern Bulgaria. It is located in the Satovcha Municipality, Blagoevgrad Province.

Geography 

The village of Slashten is located in the Western Rhodope Mountains. It belongs to the Chech region.

History 

In 1873 Slashten (Slaschtene) had male population of 130 Pomaks and 50 houses. According to Vasil Kanchov, in 1900 Slashten was populated by 750 Bulgarian Muslims According to another statistic by Kanchov about the same time there were 90 houses in the village.

Religions 

The population is Muslim and consists of Pomaks.

Culture and Nature 

The cave Stapalkite (The Steps) is 64 meters long with 38 meters denivelation (vertical rise).

References 

Villages in Blagoevgrad Province
Chech